Mordellaria zenchii is a species of beetle in the genus Mordellaria of the family Mordellidae. It was described in 1953.

References

Beetles described in 1953
Mordellidae